The Seventh Room is a 1995 Italian-Hungarian biography film based on the life of Edith Stein.

Cast 
 Maia Morgenstern - Edith Stein
 Jan Nowicki - Franz Heller
 Anna Polony - Sister Giuseppa 
 Elide Melli - Rosa
 Giovanni Capalbo - Paul
 Adriana Asti - Augusta
 Jerzy Radziwiłowicz - Hans
 Cintia Lodetti
 Nella Ammendola - 
 Zsuzsa Czinkóczi - Dora
 Ryszard Lukowski - Jakob
 Jerzy Bińczycki
 Teresa Budzisz-Krzyżanowska
 Fanny Ardant

References

External links 

1990s biographical films
Films directed by Márta Mészáros
Hungarian biographical films
Italian biographical films
Italian World War II films
Hungarian World War II films